Gail Koziara Boudreaux (born 1960) is an American businesswoman and athlete. In college, she played for the Dartmouth Big Green Women's basketball team from 1978 through 1982. She later served as an executive for a number of companies such as Aetna, BlueCross BlueShield of Illinois (2002) and UnitedHealth Group (2008). In 2020 she was #10 on the Forbes list of "The World's 100 Most Powerful Women". From 2008 to 2014 she was on the Fortune list of powerful women, peaking at #25. In Fall 2014, she stepped down from the CEO position of UnitedHealthcare (the largest business division of UHG), then forming her own healthcare consulting company GKB Global Health, LLC. In November 2017, she became CEO of Elevance Health, Inc., now the second largest American company with a woman CEO.

High school
Boudreaux attended Chicopee Comprehensive High School in Chicopee, Massachusetts. Her team twice won the state championship. At 17, she averaged 23.4 points and 20 rebounds a game for the Chicopee Comprehensive girls' basketball team. She ultimately scored a school-record 1,719 career points and was named a Parade All American her senior year. The 6'2" senior center also held the Massachusetts girls' state shot-put record  with a throw of 44 feet, six inches.

College
Koziara led the Big Green women's basketball in scoring for three consecutive years, and still holds a significant number of school records. She became Dartmouth's all-time leading scorer and rebounder, with 1,933 points and 1,635 rebounds in 89 games. She also was named Ivy League Player of the Year three straight seasons, and became a two-time Academic All-American and third team All-American as well. Koziara was honored by the NCAA as a Silver Anniversary Award winner and inducted into the New England Basketball Hall of Fame and Dartmouth's Wearers of the Green Hall of Fame. She led the Big Green to the first of their many Ivy League championships. She also won four straight Ivy League women's shot put titles, with a throw of 46 feet, four inches her senior year. That same year she earned All American recognition in the shot put.

She graduated cum laude from Dartmouth College in 1982. She attended business school at Columbia University and graduated with high honors in 1989.

Professional career
She spent 20 years at AETNA, then in 2002 was named president of Blue Cross/Blue Shield of Illinois. She became the executive vice president for External Operations at Health Care Service Corporation, which encompasses Blue Cross/Blue Shield of Illinois.

In May 2008 she became executive vice president of UnitedHealthcare at UnitedHealth Group. From January 2011 to November 2014, she served as the chief executive officer of UnitedHealthcare, the biggest US insurer, serving 45 million customers with revenue of $120 billion.

In 2015, months after stepping down from her post of CEO for UnitedHeathcare, Gail founded and became CEO of GKB Global Health, LLC, a healthcare strategy and business advisory firm.

On November 6, 2017, Boudreaux was named CEO of Anthem, Inc. which has since re-branded to Elevance Health, Inc.

Awards and recognition
Boudreaux was honored from 2008 to 2021 as one of Fortune'''s 50 Most Powerful Women in American Business and as one of the Forbes 100 Most Powerful Women in The World.
 In 2020 she was #10 on the Forbes list of The 100 Most Powerful Women.
 In 2021 she was #16 on the Forbes'' list of The 100 Most Powerful Women.

As recently as 2021, Boudreaux was also named by Modern Healthcare as one of the Most Powerful People in Healthcare. She was recognized by the Minneapolis/St. Paul Business Journal as one of the top 25 industry leaders, and included on Today's Chicago Woman list of 100 Women of Influence. 

In 2018, Boudreaux was awarded the Billie Jean King Contribution Award.

In 2022, Boudreaux was awarded the Theodore Roosevelt Award, as well as being inducted into the CoSIDA Academic All-America Hall of Fame Class of 2022.

Bibliography

Dartmouth Big Green women's basketball media guide. (PDF copy available at www.DartmouthSports.com)
Gail Koziara Boudreaux. Ivy at 50 – Council of Ivy Group Presidents, January 8, 2007.
 Gail Koziara Boudreaux Named NCAA Silver Anniversary Award Recipient. Dartmouth Varsity athletics, November 6, 2006.
NCAA Announces 2007 NCAA Silver Anniversary Award Recipients. National Collegiate Athletic Association – NCAA.org, November 6, 2006
UnitedHealth Group: Gail K. Boudreaux to Head Commercial Markets Group. (Archived) Reuters, April 22, 2008.
Faces in the Crowd. Sports Illustrated, February 27, 1978
Faces in the Crowd. Sports Illustrated, May 31, 1982

References

Dartmouth Big Green women's basketball players
Living people
People from Chicopee, Massachusetts
Basketball players from Massachusetts
Aetna employees
Columbia Business School alumni
American women chief executives
20th-century American businesspeople
21st-century American businesspeople
American women's basketball players
American health care chief executives
1960 births
20th-century American businesswomen
21st-century American businesswomen
American chief executives of Fortune 500 companies